The Hive is a CGI-animated children's television series that aired on Disney Junior from September 10, 2010, to December 12, 2012 and was produced by Hive Enterprises and animated by several animation studios.

Premise and format
The Hive features the Bee Family and explores everyday things concerning small children (such as playing, being friendly, spending time with your family, getting along, finding out all about the world and how it works, etc.).

Characters
Buzzbee is a five-year-old bee. He is helpful and inquisitive. Rubee calls him an "annoying little brother". 
Rubee is a seven-year-old bee. She is the eldest child of Mama Bee and Papa Bee, older daughter and sister to Buzzbee and Babee. Buzzbee calls her a "bossy big sister". Rubee is a computer wizz.
Babee is Buzzbee and Rubee's baby sister. She loves to giggle and play with her sister and brother.
Momma Bee is the mother of Buzzbee, Rubee and Babee and the wife of Pappa Bee. She often bakes cakes and other food.
Pappa Bee is the father of Buzzbee, Rubee and Babee and the husband of Mamma Bee. He often sits on the sofa reading his newspaper. 
Grandma Bee is the grandmother of Buzzbee, Rubee and Babee and the wife of Grandpa Bee. She looks after Rubee, Buzzbee and Babee when Mamma Bee isn't at home. Unknown if she has mothered Momma Bee or Pappa Bee.
Grandpa Bee is the grandfather of Buzzbee, Rubee and Babee and the husband of Grandma Bee. He often gives Buzzbee a treat and tells him a story. Like Grandma Bee, it's unknown if he has fathered Mamma Bee or Pappa Bee.
Jump is Grandma and Grandpa Bee's pet flea. He is very energetic and loves to jump around a lot.
Jasper is a mischievous wasp who often plays tricks on his friends. He is one of Buzzbee's best friends and sometimes sarcastic and calls Barnabee a slowworm.
Barnabee is a loyal and truthful bee who is another one of Buzzbee's best friends. He wears glasses.
Debee' is Rubee's best friend. She has freckles and brown pigtails.
Miss Ladybird is Buzzbee's teacher from Honeydew School.
Postman Spider is a postman who is good friends with Buzzbee.
Katypillar is a caterpillar who looks after and plants flowers.
Mr Millipede is a millipede who is a mechanic.
Doctor Beetle is a beetle who is a doctor.
Millice and Vince are two ants who work in Anthill Store.
Lord Bartlebee Buzz is a lord who is briefly snobbish but kind. He is the Queen's personal servant.
Queen Bee is a queen bee who is Lord Bartlebee's love interest. She is good friends with Buzzbee.
Mrs Wasp is Jasper's Mum. She is good friends with Buzzbee's Mum. 
Snail is a snail and a student from Honeydew School. He hides in his shell when he gets scared.
Spider is a spider and a student from Honeydew School. He may be Postman Spider's son.
Worm is a silent and really annoying worm who appears in every episode and in the ending credits.
Birds: The two blue birds which appear in every episode on a nearby tree. The male’s name is Feathers while the female’s name is Fluff
Clara Bee is the cleaner of Honeydew School. Unseen but mentioned only by Miss Ladybird in episode "Have You Heard?"
Worker Bees are three bees who keep collecting pollen grains from the Flower Field.
Herbee is a four year old bee. He is Barnabee's little brother.
Mrs. Butterfly is Katypillar's mother.

Episodes

Season 1 (2010-2012)

DVD releases
Playtime in Honeybee Hive
 Postman Buzzbee
 Computer Bee
 Buzzbee the Magician
 Babee's Room
 Scaredy Bee
 Birthday Bee
 Sporty Bee
 A Royal Visit

Visiting the Doctor With Buzzbee
 Buzzbee to the Rescue
 Healthy Bee
 Being Mamma Bee
 Sleepy Bee
 A Droopy Antenna
 Brave Bee
 Don't Be Greedy
 Pappa Gets Fit

Let's Get Green
 Buzzbee's Garden
 Buzzbee Cleans Up
Buzzbee big holiday

 A Windy Day
 Buzzbee Helps Out
 Useful Bee
 Buzzbee's Den
 Rainy Day Fun
 It's Not Easy Being Green

Dance Party!
 Dancing Bee
 Musical Bees
 Do The Sticky Stomp
 Loyal Bee
 Spring Bee
 Peek-a-Bee
 Funny Bee
 Rain Dance

References

External links
 

 

2010s British children's television series
2010 British television series debuts
2016 British television series endings
British preschool education television series
ITV children's television shows
Disney Channel original programming
Australian Broadcasting Corporation original programming
British computer-animated television series
Animated television series about children
Animated television series about insects
2010s British animated television series
Animated preschool education television series
2010s preschool education television series
English-language television shows